The Prusa i3 is a family of fused deposition modeling 3D printers, manufactured by Czech company Prusa Research under the trademarked name Original Prusa i3. Part of the RepRap project, Prusa i3 printers were named the most used 3D printer in the world. The first Prusa i3 was designed by Josef Průša in 2012, and was released as a commercial kit product in 2015. The latest model (MK3S+, as of November 2020) is available in both kit and factory assembled versions. The Prusa i3's comparable low cost and ease of construction and modification has made it popular in education and with hobbyists and professionals, with the printer receiving several awards as a result. The i3 series is released under an open source license, as such there have been variants of the printer produced by companies and individuals worldwide.

Models

RepRap Mendel 
First conceived in 2009, RepRap Mendel 3D printers were designed to be assembled from 3D printed parts and commonly available off-the-shelf components (referred to as "vitamins," as they cannot be produced by the printer itself). These parts include threaded rods, leadscrews, smooth rods and bearings, screws, nuts, stepper motors, control circuit boards, and a "hot end" to melt and place thermoplastic materials. A Cartesian mechanism with a movable flat bed and tool motion on two horizontal and two vertical rods permit placement of material anywhere in a cubic volume; this design has continued throughout development of the i3 series.

Prusa Mendel
Josef Průša, a core developer of the RepRap project who had previously developed a PCB heated "bed" on which parts are printed, adapted and simplified the RepRap Mendel design, reducing the time to print 3D plastic parts from 20 to 10 hours, and including 3D printed bushings in place of regular bearings. First announced in September 2010, the printer was dubbed Prusa Mendel by Průša himself. According to the RepRap wiki, "Prusa Mendel is the Ford Model T of 3D printers."

Prusa Mendel (Iteration 2)
Průša streamlined his Mendel design, releasing "Prusa Iteration 2" in November 2011. Parts changes allowed for snap-fit assembly (no glue required); fewer tools were needed to construct and maintain this version. Although not required, fine-pitch manufactured pulleys and LM8UU linear bearings were recommended over printed equivalents for "professional" results.

Prusa i3
In May 2012, Průša released a major redesign, focused on ease of construction and use, and no longer structured around the simplest available common hardware as previous RepRap printers were. The Prusa i3 design replaced the threaded-rod, triangular Z axis frame construction with a rigid, single-piece water jet cut aluminium vertical frame to improve printing speed and accuracy; M10 threaded rods were still used in the base. It used a single piece, food safe stainless steel hot end called the Prusa Nozzle which printed with 3 mm filament, and used M5 threaded rods as lead screws instead of M8.

Three years later in 2015, Průša released an i3 full kit under the brand name "Original Prusa i3" after having realized that there was a market for 3D printer kits. For about three months the Prusa i3 was delivered set up for a proprietary 3 mm filament diameter (which retrospectively has been dubbed the "mark zero"), before the Mk1 update when it was switched to the more common filament diameter of 1.75 mm.

Prusa i3 MK2 and MK2S
Průša released the Prusa i3 MK2 in May, 2016. It was the first hobby printer with mesh bed leveling and automatic geometry skew correction for all three axes. Features included a larger build volume, custom stepper motors with integrated lead screws, a non-contact inductive sensor for auto-leveling, and a rewritten version of the Marlin firmware. Other new features include a polyetherimide print surface, Rambo controller board and an E3D V6 Full hotend. The Prusa MK2 became the first RepRap printer to be supported by Windows 10 Plug-and-Play USB ID.

In March 2017, Průša announced on his blog that the revised Prusa i3 MK2S would ship in place of the Prusa i3 MK2. Enhancements cited include U-bolts to hold the LM8UU bearings where cable ties had been used, higher quality bearings and rods, an improved mount for the inductance sensor, improved cable management, and a new electronics cover.  An upgrade kit was offered to owners of the MK2 to add these improvements.

Prusa i3 MK3 and MK2.5
In September 2017, Prusa i3 MK3 was released, marketed as "bloody smart." Starting with this model, the base and Y axis were assembled with aluminium extrusion, eliminating the last of the structural threaded rods from the Mendel design. Included were a new extruder with dual Bondtech drive-gears, quieter fans with RPM monitoring, faster print speeds, an updated bed leveling sensor, a new electronics board named "Einsy", quieter stepper motors with 128 step microstepping drivers and a magnetic heatbed with interchangeable PEI-coated steel sheets. Electrical components were updated to work with the new 24 volt power supply. The printer also offers dedicated sockets to connect Raspberry Pi Zero W running a fork of the open source OctoPrint software for wireless printing.

Ease-of-use features included a filament detector, allowing the printer to load filament when it is inserted, and to pause printing if the filament is jammed or runs out; error-correcting stepper motor drivers preventing layer shifts due to skipped steps; and recovery after power outages. The ambient temperature sensor both confirms suitable environment temperature and detects overheated electrical connections on the main board.

Existing MK2 and MK2S users were offered a $199 partial upgrade named MK2.5, limited to features which are cheaper to upgrade. After negative feedback from the community, Prusa made available a more expensive $500 MK2S to MK3 full upgrade.

Prusa i3 MK3S and MK3S+
In February 2019, Prusa i3 MK3S was released, along with the Multi Material Upgrade 2S (MMU2S), which allows selecting any of 5 different materials for printing together automatically. MK3S changes include a simplified mechanical filament sensor, improved print cooling, and easier access to service the extruder.

Prusa made a running change starting November, 2020 to the Prusa i3 MK3S+. This model has a revised bed leveling sensor and minor parts changes.

Other Prusa Models 
Following the MK3S, Prusa introduced two unrelated models, the Prusa Mini (with a cantilever arm) and Prusa XL (using a Core XY method inside a full-frame structure). These printers are not iterations of the Mendel frame design.

Recognition 
 In 2012, Josef Průša received honors from the governor of the Vysočina Region in the Czech Republic for his accomplishments in technology.
 In February 2014 he was featured on the cover of Czech Forbes magazine as one of the 30 under 30 list.
The MK2 and MK2S printers both won Best Overall 3D Printer awards from Make: Magazine.
 Deloitte placed Prusa Research at the top of the 2018 Deloitte Technology Fast 50 as the fastest growing company in Central Europe.
 The 3D Hubs Q3 2018 Trends report noted that the Prusa i3 MK2, MK2S and MK3 had been used to manufacture nearly 35% of all prints ordered through their fee-for-service business. 
The MK3 was named FFF 3D printer of the year for 2019 by 3D Printing Industry.
 Průša was again featured on the cover of the Czech edition of Forbes in 2019 for his leadership at the now billion-koruna company.
All3DP named the MK3 Best 3D Printer of 2018, and the MK3S Best 3D Printer of 2020.

Components and materials 
All Prusa i3 models use 3D printing filament as feedstock to make parts.

Like other RepRap printers the Prusa i3 is capable of creating many of its own parts. Formerly these were printed in ABS plastic; Prusa Research now uses mostly PETG instead. Prusa Research maintains a "print farm" of 600 3D printers (as of October 2021) to manufacture plastic parts for Original Prusa branded products.

Like most FDM 3D printers, the Prusa i3 uses a nozzle with standard M6-threads.

Prusament 
In 2020, Prusa launched their own line of materials called Prusament, which are designed to be extremely consistent. Prusament materials come with a QR code which allows customers to view the exact specifications and test results from their spool.

PINDA 
When extruding the first layer, the print head must be a precise distance away from the build plate for proper adhesion. Many 3D printers rely on the user to complete this process by adjusting the height of the bed at several locations ("bed leveling"). To automate this process Prusa manufactures and sells an inductive sensor called the Pinda (Prusa INDuction Autoleveling sensor) which can be used to measure the exact height of the printbed at different locations, and then adjust for it when printing ("auto-leveling").
There are 3 different versions of the sensor:
 PINDA V1 - used on MK2/S and MINI.
 PINDA V2 - used on MK2.5, MK2.5S, MK3, and MK3S.
 SuperPINDA - Compatible/used with MK2.5/S, and MK3/S/+.

The difference between PINDA V1 and V2 is that the V2 has an inbuilt thermistor to compensate for the difference in cold and hot measurements. The SuperPINDA does not have a thermistor, as its high-quality components and manufacturing remove the need for one.

Variants
With all aspects of the design freely available under open source and open hardware terms, companies and individuals around the world have produced Prusa i3 copies, variants, and upgrades in assembled and kit form, with thousands offered for sale as early as 2015. Rather than compete directly with these, Prusa Research's strategy is to pursue continual refinement of its designs.

Frames 

The distinguishing feature of the i3 from its predecessors is the vertical frame, which can take many forms. These include single sheet frames cut from steel or acrylic, box frames from plywood or medium-density fibreboard, and Lego. Inexpensive aluminum extrusion is commonly used, both by printer enthusiasts and by manufacturers of "clone" i3 printers. Some mass market i3 variants, such as many Shenzhen Creality products, use rollers against the extruded frame itself instead of precision rods and bearings to reduce cost and complexity.

Extruders
Beyond the standard Prusa i3 filament extruders, others have created aftermarket extruders and enthusiast tool heads, including a MIG welder and a laser cutter. Průša offered a collection of functional cooking tools and programs under the name "MK3 Master Chef Upgrade" as an April Fools' Day gag in 2018.

See also 
 Prusa MINI
 Prusa XL

References

External links
 Prusa Research

Open hardware electronic devices
3D printing
RepRap project
3D printer companies
Czech brands